Agony in the Garden is a 1405-1408 French painting in the international Gothic style, which has been in the Museo del Prado since May 2012. It was produced in Paris on a Baltic oak panel. The artist is unknown, though it could by Colart de Leon (fl. 1377; died before 27 May 1417), who was painter and 'valet de chambre' to Louis I, Duke of Orléans, shown at bottom left and probably the commissioner of the work.

References

15th-century paintings
Paintings of the Museo del Prado by French artists
Gothic paintings
Paintings depicting the Passion of Jesus